X Marks the Spot is a 1942 American film noir crime film directed by George Sherman and Damian O'Flynn, Helen Parrish, and Dick Purcell. It is a remake of the 1931 film of the same name.

Plot
In 1942, during the second world war, rubber is a valuable commodity. Eddie Delaney is a second lieutenant in the army, but also a private detective. Eddy swings into action, when his father, police-sergeant Timothy J. Delaney, is gunned down by rubber racketeers.

Cast
 Damian O'Flynn as Eddie Delaney
 Helen Parrish as Linda Ward
 Dick Purcell as Lieutenant William 'Bill' Decker
 Jack La Rue as Marty Clark
 Neil Hamilton as John J. Underwood
 Robert Homans as Police Sergeant Timothy J. Delaney
 Anne Jeffreys as Lulu
 Dick Wessel as Henchman Dizzy
 Esther Muir as Bonnie Bascomb
 Joe Kirk as Henchman Jerry
 Edna Mae Harris as Billie (as Edna Harris)
 Fred Kelsey as Police Officer Martin
 Vince Barnett as George

Sam Bernard, Edmund Cobb, Martin Faust, Jack Gardner, Sam Lufkin, Charles McAvoy and Frank O'Connor appears uncredited.

External links 

 
 

1942 films
American mystery films
1940s English-language films
American black-and-white films
Republic Pictures films
1942 mystery films
Films directed by George Sherman
Remakes of American films
1940s American films